David Michael Norris (born 20 August 1972, in Eastbourne, England) is a former British international motorcycle speedway rider.

Career
Norris had stints with Reading Racers and Ipswich Witches, but primarily rode for the Eastbourne Eagles in the British League, Premier League, and Elite League. In 2007 he overtook Gordon Kennett as the Eagles' leading scorer, accumulating 5,197 points from just 577 meetings. He burst onto the world scene in 2004, aged 32, when adopting a new 'more professional' attitude towards the sport, going on to appear as a wild card in the British Speedway Grand Prix in 2004 and 2005.

Retirement
A succession of injuries dogged him in 2006 and 2007 though and he announced his retirement from speedway in October 2007. He said: "I'm at a stage now where I can't take another hit on my head or neck. If I didn’t have kids and my wife I might consider carrying on, but you can’t just live for yourself." However, after holding talks with his doctor and family, Norris came out of retirement and once again rode for the Eastbourne Eagles during the 2009 season, assisted in the pits by Dean Barker.

References 

1972 births
Living people
British speedway riders
English motorcycle racers
Sportspeople from Eastbourne
Eastbourne Eagles riders
Ipswich Witches riders
Reading Racers riders